Neodiplograptidae is an extinct family of graptolites.

Genera
List of genera from Maletz (2014):

Subfamily Neodiplograptinae
†Korenograptus Melchin et al., 2011
†Metabolograptus Obut & Sennikov, 1985
†Neodiplograptus Legrand, 1987
†Paraclimacograptus Přibyl, 1948b
†Persculptograptus Koren’ & Rickards, 1996
†Rickardsograptus Melchin et al., 2011

Subfamily Petalolithinae
†Agetograptus Obut & Sobolevskaya in Obut et al., 1968
†Cephalograpsus Hopkinson, 1869
†Comograptus Obut & Sobolevskaya, 1968 in Obut et al. (1968)
†Corbograptus Koren’ & Rickards, 1996
†Demicystifer Hundt, 1959
? †Demicystograptus Hundt, 1950
†Dimorphograptoides Koren’ & Rickards, 1996
†Diprion Barrande, 1850
†Dittograptus Obut & Sobolevskaya, 1968 in Obut et al. (1968)
†Glyptograptus Lapworth, 1873
†Hercograptus Melchin, 1999
†Paramplexograptus Melchin et al., 2011
†Parapetalolithus Koren’ & Rickards, 1996
†Petalograptus Suess, 1851
†Petalolithus Suess, 1851
†Pseudorthograptus Legrand, 1987
†Rivagraptus Koren’ & Rickards, 1996
†Songxigraptus Fang, Liang & Yu, 1990
†Spinadiplograptus Hundt, 1965
†Sudburigraptus Koren’ & Rickards, 1996
†Victorograptus Koren’ & Rickards, 1996

References

Graptolites
Prehistoric hemichordate families